Kaixin001 is a social networking website launched in March 2008.

In 2015, Kaixin001 ranks as the 743rd most popular website in China and 7,277 overall according to Alexa Internet.

On 20 May 2009, Kaixin001 formally sued Qianxiang Group for unfair competition. Qianxiang Group runs one of China's popular social networks Renren. It purchased the kaixin.com domain and launched a Kaixin001 clone. This enables Renren to confuse users and attract some Kaixin001 potential users to the Kaixin.com clone. In October 2011, Kaixin001 won a victory. The Beijing Second Intermediate People's Court ordered Oak Pacific to cease all use of kaixin.com and pay 400,000 renminbi ($60,000) in damages. The other main competition for Kaixin001 is Weibo.com, which is like a hybrid of Twitter and Facebook. Weibo.com has 140 million users and is owned by Sina.com.

Applications
Kaixin001 launched the social games craze in China.
 Friends for Sale: A game that users can price and sell their friends.
 Parking Wars: Ironically most people in China can’t afford a real car, which makes this game all the more compelling.
 iLike: Up until recent crackdowns, the Chinese equivalent allowed you to upload and share your entire music collection with your friends.
 Where I’ve Been: This application defaults to a province map of China because most people have never left the country.

Users
 Kaixin001 attracted white-collar office workers by focusing on fun, addictive social games.
 Kaixin001’s users are highly active. It averages 34 pageviews and 33 minutes spent on the site per user, numbers that are about twice as high as the competition. Kaixin001’s white-collars love surfing the site at work, and occasionally in their free time too.

Advertising Campaign
Kaixin001 focused on advertisements planted deep into its products. Some cases made a great success that a lot users didn’t even know it was an ad. In 2009 and 2010, players of Kaixin001's Happy Garden can plant seeds and squeeze juice for Lohas, a soft drink made by COFCO, China's biggest food manufacturer; they can also enter a lottery to win Lohas. And players of Happy Restaurant can earn virtual currency by hanging ads for companies on the walls of their virtual eateries. After meals, they can also hand out sticks of Wrigley's gum.

Mobile Games
After the Chinese internet titan Tencent invested Kaixin001 in 2011, Kaixin001 began to develop mobile games. By July 2014, Kaixin001 released 18 mobile games, the most successful one named Clash of Three Kingdoms, a simulation mobile game. It also did some international business, with its revenue from Korea and Taiwan at more than 6 million USD per month.

See also

 Renren

References

External links
 
 开心网 - Kaixin001: The Happiest Chinese Social Network?

Chinese social networking websites
Internet properties established in 2008
2008 establishments in China